Mariano Acosta is a station on the Buenos Aires Premetro. It was opened on 29 April 1987 together with the other Premetro stations. The station is located next to the Estadio Nueva España, the home ground of the Deportivo Español football team.

References

Buenos Aires PreMetro stations
Buenos Aires Underground stations
Railway stations opened in 1987